Ho Kai-ming may refer to:
Ho Kai-ming (FTU), Hong Kong politician, member of HKFTU
Kalvin Ho Kai-ming (ADPL), Hong Kong politician, member of ADPL
Kai-Ming Ho, American physicist